The Alpine ibex (Capra ibex), also known as the steinbock, bouquetin, or simply ibex, is a species of wild goat that lives in the mountains of the European Alps. It is a sexually dimorphic species: males are larger and carry longer, curved horns than females. Its coat colour is typically brownish grey. Alpine ibex tend to live in steep, rough terrain near the snow line. They are also social, although adult males and females segregate for most of the year, coming together only to mate. Four distinct groups exist; adult male groups, female-offspring groups, groups of young individuals, and mixed-sex groups.

During the breeding season, males fight for access to females, and use their long horns in agonistic behaviour. After being extirpated from most areas by the 19th century, the Alpine ibex was successfully reintroduced to parts of its historical range. All individuals living today descend from the stock in Gran Paradiso National Park in Aosta Valley and Piemonte (Italy), a national park created to help the ibex thrive. The ibex is the emblem of both the Gran Paradiso National Park, and the contiguous Vanoise National Park across the French border. The species is currently listed as of least concern by the IUCN, but went through a population bottleneck of fewer than 100 individuals during its near-extinction event. This has led to very low genetic diversity across populations.

Taxonomy and phylogeny
The Alpine ibex was first described by Carl Linnaeus in 1758. It is classified in the genus Capra (Latin for "goat") with at least seven other species of wild goats. Both Capra and Ovis (sheep) descended from a goral-like animal from the Miocene and early Pliocene, whose fossils are found in Kenya, China, and Slovenia. The genus Tossunnoria appears in China during the late Miocene and appears to have been intermediate between gorals and goats. Fossils of Alpine ibex date back to the late Pleistocene, when  the Spanish ibex and it probably evolved from the extinct Pleistocene species Capra camburgensis. The Nubian (C. nubiana), walia (C. walie), and Siberian ibexes (C. sibirica) were previously considered to be subspecies of the Alpine ibex, giving populations in the Alps the trinomial of C. i. ibex.

Appearance

Compared with other members of its genus, the Alpine ibex has a short, broad head and a duller coat. It has brownish-grey hair over most of the body, a pale abdomen, and slightly darker markings on the chin and throat and in a stripe along the back. They moult twice a year, firstly in April or May, and then again in September, when they replace the short summer coat with thicker hair and a woolly undercoat.

Both male and female Alpine ibex have large, backwards-curving horns with numerous ridges along their length. At , those of the males are substantially larger than those of females, which reach only  in length.

Distribution and ecology

During the Last Glacial Period the species range was reaching as far south as Greece, where it disappeared in the Holocene, after 5,600 BC due to hunting, with the last known remains being found on mountains surrounding Thessaly. The Alpine ibex was, at one point, restricted only to the Gran Paradiso National Park in northern Italy, and the contiguous Maurienne Valley in the French Alps but it was reintroduced to most of the Alps. Reintroductions started in 1906 into Switzerland. Alpine ibex are now found in most or all of the Italian and French alpine ranges, southern Germany, Switzerland and Austria. It has also been introduced to Bulgaria and Slovenia.

Alpine ibex are typically absent from woodland areas, although adult males in densely populated areas may stay in larch and mixed larch-spruce woodland if no snow has fallen. Males spend the winter in coniferous forests. For most of the year, males and females occupy different habitats. Females rely on steep terrain more so than males. Males use lowland meadows during the spring, which is when snow melts and green grass appears. They then climb to alpine meadows during the summer. When winter arrives, both sexes move to steep, rocky slopes that amass little snow. They prefer slopes of 30–45° and use small caves and overhangs for shelter. Home ranges are highly variable, depending on the availability of resources, and vary in size throughout the year. Figures from  have been recorded. Home ranges tend to be largest during summer and autumn, smallest in winter, and intermediate in spring. Female home ranges are usually smaller than those of males. Alpine ibex appear to have a low rate of predation and in Gran Paradiso typically die of age, starvation, or disease.

Foraging

Alpine ibex are strictly herbivorous, with over half of their diet consisting of grasses, and the remainder being a mixture of mosses, flowers, leaves, and twigs. If leaves and shoots are out of reach, they often stand on their rear legs to reach this food. Grass genera that are the most commonly eaten are Agrostis, Avena, Calamagrostis, Festuca, Phleum, Poa, Sesleria, and Trisetum. The climbing ability of the Alpine ibex is such that it has been observed standing on the sheer face of the Cingino Dam in Piedmont, Italy, where it licks the stonework to obtain mineral salts.

Life history
Although the Alpine ibex is a social species, they segregate sexually and spatially depending on the season. Four types of groups exist: Adult male groups, female-offspring groups, groups of young individuals 2–3 years old, and mixed-sex groups. Young groups are numerous at the beginning of summer, but are expelled by females at the end of their gestation period. Female and offspring groups occur year-round, at least in an area of the French Alps. Mixed-sex groups of adult males and females occur during breeding, which lasts from December to January. By April and May, the adults separate. The largest aggregations of either sex occur during June and July. Gatherings of males begin to decrease during October and November, and are lowest from the rut from December to March. The males then leave their separate wintering areas and gather again.

A linear dominance hierarchy exists among males. In small populations, which are more cohesive, males know their place in the hierarchy based on memories of past encounters, while in mobile and large groups, where encounters with strangers are common, rank is based on horn size. Antagonistic behavior in males can come in the form of "direct" or "indirect" aggression. With direct aggression, one male bumps another with his horns or places himself in front of his opponent. He stands on his hind legs and comes down on his opponent with his horns. This may signal that he is ready to clash or may be attempting a real clash.  Indirect aggression is mostly intimidation displays.

Reproduction and growth
The breeding season starts in December, and typically lasts around six weeks. During this time, male herds break up into smaller groups that search for females. The rut takes place in two phases. In the first phase, the male groups interact with the females that are all in oestrous. The higher the male's rank, the closer he can get to a female. Males perform courtship displays. In the second phase of the rut, one male separates from his group to follow an individual female.  He displays to her and guards her from other males.  Before copulation, the female moves her tail and courtship becomes more intense. They copulate and then he rejoins his group and reverts to the first phase. Gestation lasts around 167 days, and results in the birth of one or two kids, with twins making up about 20% of births.

Alpine ibex reach sexual maturity at 18 months, but females do not reach their maximum body size for five to six years, and males not for 9–11 years. The horns grow throughout life, growing most rapidly during the second year of life, and thereafter by about  a year, eventually slowing to half that rate once the animal reaches 10 years of age. Alpine ibex live for up to 19 years in the wild.

Conservation status

The Alpine ibex historically ranged through France, Italy, Switzerland, Liechtenstein, Bavaria, Austria and Slovenia. Starting in the early 16th century and with firearms becoming common, the overall population declined due to overexploitation and poaching. The ibex became extirpated in Switzerland and Germany by the 18th century, and was extirpated in Austria and northeastern Italy by the 19th century. They remained only in and around the adjacent Gran Paradiso and Vanoise Massifs, then both part of the Kingdom of Sardinia. Located in the western Italian Alps and the Maurienne valley in the north eastern French alps, bordering the Vanoise and Gran Paradiso Massif, the park was declared a royal hunting reserve in 1854 with the name of "Royal hunting reserve of Gran Paradiso" by Victor Emmanuel II, the first king of a united Italy.

Ibex were protected from poaching and their numbers increased, reaching 3,020 in 1914. The ibex enjoyed further protection when Gran Paradiso was made into a national park in 1922. Animals from this population naturally dispersed into surrounding regions. However, reintroductions have been the predominant source of new populations. Today, the total population of Alpine ibex is over 30,000 and is considered to be of Least Concern by the IUCN. However, Alpine ibex have low genetic diversity putting them at risk of inbreeding depression.

References

External links

 Alpine Ibex European Specialists Group
 Ultimate Ungulate factsheet
 Animal Planet Mammal Guide

Capra (genus)
Mammals of Europe
Mammals described in 1758
Taxa named by Carl Linnaeus
Articles containing video clips